Johan van der Velde (born 12 December 1956 in Rijsbergen) is a former Dutch cyclist. In the 1980 Tour de France, he won the young rider classification, also placing 12th in the general classification that year. He had been a racing cyclist for only a year. In the 1981 Tour de France, he took first place on the second and 21st stages, finishing 12th overall for the second year. He rode with TI–Raleigh in the Tour de France from 1979 to 1983 and the Panasonic team where he won Stage 5 and wore the Yellow Jersey for two days in the 1986 Tour de France.

Decline
He was distinctive in the peloton for his lean, long-legged appearance, his smooth pedalling style and his long hair. He rode in support of riders such as Joop Zoetemelk, whom he could pace over mountains at impressive speed, but he was also capable of winning on his own. Success came to him early and, he said in an interview with the author Jan Siebelink ("Pijn is genot") that he had trouble coping when that success began to dry up. Van der Velde said he remembered shivering at the start of an Italian race, the skin of his arms wrinkled in goosebumps, because of the amphetamine he had taken just to start.

Addiction to amphetamine and a lifelong habit of petty theft, which he said came from seeing his father bring home things he had stolen from work, brought him into trouble with the law. He was caught stealing lawnmowers and breaking into post office stamp machines to raise money to cover his addiction and his gambling. The jail sentence and the loss of all he had won forced him and his Belgian wife, Josée, to sell the villa they had owned. They moved into a series of anonymous houses and apartments. Van der Velde began hospital treatment for his addiction and became deeply religious. He began work on building sites, rarely saying who he was or what he had been, to rebuild his self-esteem. For many years he tried to keep his address and his identity secret.

Rehabilitation
Van der Velde is now often seen at junior races, where he accompanies his son, also a racer. He took part in a celebrity edition of the Big Brother television series in 2000 and has worked in public relations for the Quickstep team, driving its guests at races. It was announced that van der Velde would join the new Roompot Orange Cycling Team as a driver for 2015.

His manager at Ti-Raleigh, Peter Post, said he had always considered Van der Velde the son that he had never had.

Career achievements

Major results

1977
 1st Stages 3 & 5 Tour de Liège
1978
 1st  Overall Tour de Romandie
1st Stages 1 & 5
 1st  Overall Tour of Britain
1st Stage 4
 1st  Overall Ronde van Nederland
1st Stage 4
1979
 1st Stage 2 Tour de Romandie
1980
 1st  Road race, National Road Championships
 12th Overall Tour de France
1st  Young rider classification
1st Stages 1b (TTT) & 7b (TTT)
 1st  Overall Critérium du Dauphiné Libéré
1st Stage 6
 2nd Overall Volta a Catalunya
1st Stages 1, 4a, 4b & 5
1981
 1st Stages 1b (TTT), 2, 7 (TTT) & 21 Tour de France
 1st Prologue Critérium du Dauphiné Libéré
 1st Stages 1, 2 & 4 Volta a Catalunya
 1st Stage 5a Tour de Romandie
 1st Stage 4b GP du Midi-Libre
 1st Stage 4 Ronde van Nederland
1982
 1st  Road race, National Road Championships
 3rd Overall Tour de France
1st Stage 9a (TTT)
 1st Stage 2 Volta a Catalunya
 1st Stage 5a Ronde van Nederland
1983
 1st Züri-Metzgete
 1st Stage 5 Setmana Catalana de Ciclisme
1984
 1st Stage 5a Tour de Romandie
1985
 1st  Points classification Giro d'Italia
 1st Coppa Bernocchi
 1st Stage 4 Tour de Romandie
1986
 1st Stage 5 Tour de France
 1st Stage 19 Giro d'Italia
 1st Brabantse Pijl
1987
 9th Overall Giro d'Italia
1st  Points classification
1st Stages 15 & 16
 1st Stage 3 Tour de Suisse
1988
 1st  Points classification Giro d'Italia

Grand Tour general classification results timeline

See also
List of doping cases in cycling
 List of Dutch cyclists who have led the Tour de France general classification

References

External links 
 Official website Johan van der Velde (Dutch)
 
 Official Tour de France results for Johan van der Velde
 

1956 births
Living people
Doping cases in cycling
Dutch male cyclists
Dutch sportspeople in doping cases
Dutch Tour de France stage winners
Cyclists from Zundert
Dutch Giro d'Italia stage winners
Tour de Suisse stage winners